The 2013–14 season of the Oberliga Baden-Württemberg, the highest association football league in the state of Baden-Württemberg, was the sixth season of the league at tier five (V) of the German football league system and the 36th season overall since establishment of the league in 1978. The regular season started on 9 August 2013 and finished on 24 May 2014.

The league was won by FC Astoria Walldorf which thereby earned promotion to the Regionalliga Südwest for 2014–15. Runners-up TSV Grunbach declined to take part in the promotion round to the Regionalliga and instead withdrew to the Kreisliga after failed merger talks with 1. CfR Pforzheim. Third placed FC Nöttingen took part in the promotion round instead and defeated FSV Salmrohr, thereby earning promotion to the Regionalliga. 1. FC Heidenheim completely withdrew its reserve team from league football while 1. FC Bruchsal and SV Oberachern were relegated to the Verbandsligas.

Standings 
The league featured four new clubs with FV Ravensburg and 1. FC Heidenheim II promoted from the Verbandsliga Württemberg, SV Oberachern from the Verbandsliga Südbaden and 1. FC Bruchsal from the Verbandsliga Baden. No club had been relegated from the Regionalliga Südwest to the Oberliga Baden-Württemberg in the previous season.

Top goalscorers
The top goal scorers for the season:

Promotion play-offs
Promotion play-offs were held at the end of the season for both the Regionalliga above and the Oberliga.

To the Regionalliga
The runners-up of the Hessenliga, Oberliga Rheinland-Pfalz/Saar and the Oberliga Baden-Württemberg were scheduled to play each other for one more spot in the Regionalliga. The Hessenliga runners-up declined this opportunity leaving just two teams to play off, with FC Nöttingen winning promotion to the Regionalliga:

To the Oberliga
The runners-up of the Verbandsliga Baden, Verbandsliga Südbaden and Verbandsliga Württemberg played each other for one more spot in the Oberliga, with FC Germania Friedrichstal winning promotion to the Oberliga:
First round

Second round

References

External links 
 Oberliga Baden-Württemberg on Fupa.net 

Baden
Oberliga Baden-Württemberg seasons